Sri Siddharameshwar Maharaj (1888–1936)  was a guru in the Inchagiri Sampradaya founded by his guru Bhausaheb Maharaj, a branch of the Navnath Sampradaya, the 'Nine Masters' tradition in India. His disciples included Nath teachers Nisargadatta Maharaj, Ranjit Maharaj, Kaadsiddheshwar, and Ganapatrao Maharaj Kannur.

Biography
Siddharameshwar was born in 1888 in the village Pathri, Solapur, India. Since his childhood, he was very intelligent and had very sharp imbibe abilities. In 1906, he was initiated by his guru 'Shri Bhausaheb Maharaj' in Inchagiri in Karnataka India, who taught mantra meditation as the way to reach Final Reality. He was one of the contemporaries of Sri Ramana Maharshi.

In 1920, Siddharameshwar started to set out on "the Bird's Path", the fast way to attain realization, six years after Bhauhaseb maharaj had died. His fellow-students opposed, but eventually he succeeded by himself.

Siddharameshwar died on 9 November 1936 (Ekadashi, 11th day in the later half Ashwin), at the age of 48, giving his understanding to his disciples. It is said that dozens of his disciples became self-realized through his clear and lucid teaching. His samadhi shrine today is located at Basavan Bagewadi, Vijaypur in Karnataka.

Teachings

Atma Vidya
Atma Vidya ("Self-Knowledge") is the central theme in Siddharameshwar Maharaj's teachings. In Master Key to Self-Realization he describes how the teaching of Vedanta is transmitted to a student. It starts with the meeting with a guru, who tells about the teachings. Thereafter a mantra is being used by the student to meditate and make the mind more receptive. Then the guru explains the teaching further, which has to be realized experientially by the student.

The student has to turn away his mind from external objects and the gross body, and "turn within". By realizing that objects have only a temporary appearance, it becomes possible to develop detachment and to clear one's mental attitude from pride. This is a necessary step to develop Self-Knowledge, and the renunciation of the impermanent, and the acceptance of the permanent.

The koshas
To realize this Self-Knowledge, an investigation of the four bodies has to be made to discover whence the notion of "I" comes. Siddharameshwar Maharaj discerns four bodies:
 The Physical Gross Body
 The Subtle body: 
 the Five Senses of Action (hands, feet, mouth, genitals, and anus)
 the Five Senses of Knowledge (eyes, ears, nose, tongue, and skin)
 the Five Pranas or vital breaths (vyana vayu, samana vayu, udana vayu, apana vaya, prana vayu)
 the Mind (manas)
 The Intellect (Buddhi)
 The Causal Body, characterized by "emptiness", "ignorance" and "darkness"
 The Great-Causal Body, the knowledge of "I am" that cannot be described, the state after Ignorance and Knowledge, or Turiya state

By subsequently identifying with the three lower bodies, investigating them, and discarding identification with them when it has become clear that they are not the "I", the sense of "I am" beyond knowledge and Ignorance becomes clearly established.

The Bird's way
The teachings of Siddharameshwar have been called Vihangam Marg, "the Bird's Way", the direct path to Self-discovery, in contrast to Bhausaheb Maharaj's teachings, which have been called Pipilika Marg , "the Ant's way", the way of meditation:

Usage of classical texts
Siddharameshwar Maharaje used four books to give sermons on:
 Dasbodh of Saint Shri Samarth Ramdas
 the Yoga Vasistha
 the "Eknathi Bhagwat" of Sant Eknath
 "Sadachara" of Shri Madhvacharya

Lineage
Siddharameshwar Maharaj's preachings were further spread around the globe by his most revered disciples:
 Sri Ranjit Maharaj (1913–2000) was with Sri Siddharameshwar Maharaj for 12 years from the young age of 12 until the age of 24 
 Sri Nisargadatta Maharaj (1897–1981) was with him for a two and a half years, 1933-1936. 
 Shri Muppin Kaadsiddheshwar (1905–2001) Maharaj met his Guru Shri Siddharameshwar Maharaj in 1935 and was with him for a period of about 1 year. 
 Sri Ganapatrao Maharaj Kannur (1909 - 2004) was with him for 13 years.
 Shri Vilasanand Maharaj (1909 - 1993).
 Shri Ranachhodray Maharaj, Baitkhol Karwar.

Publications

Golden Day
Golden Day is a 10-page publication by Siddharameshwar Maharaj from 1925.

Adhyatma Jnanachi Gurukilli - Master Key to Self-Realization
The most well known book in India containing Siddharameshwar Maharaj's teachings is Adhyatma Jnanachi Gurukilli. It was transcribed by Shri Dattatray Dharmayya Poredi, a distinguished disciple of Shri Siddharameshwar Maharajs, from Siddharameshwar's teachings as spoken in the Marathi language. It was originally published by Shri Ganapatrao Maharaj of Kannur.

Shri Ranjit Maharaj received verbal permission from Shri Ganapatrao Maharaj to have the text translated into English. Ranjit Maharaj entrusted the translation responsibilities to Dr. Mrs. Damyanti Dungaji. The completed English translation was then proofread and subsequently published by Shri Siddharameshwar Adhyatma Kendra, Mumbai under the name "Master Key to Self-Realization". When all of the copies of that original English text were sold, the text was incorporated into another book of Siddharameshwar Maharaj's talks entitled "Amrut Laya", also published by Shri Siddharameshwar Adhyatma Kendra, Mumbai). It was republished by Sadguru Publications in 2008, and also included within "Master of Self-Realization" and "Amrut Laya: The Stateless State".

Adhyatmadnyanacha Yogeshwar - Master of Self-Realization: An Ultimate Understanding
Adhyatmadnyanacha Yogeshwar Vol I & II consists of 130 talks of Sri Siddharameshwar Maharaj. They were transcribed, edited and published by Nisargadatta Maharaj in 1961-1962 in Marathi language, who also wrote the preface to the book. It was translated in English and published as "Master of Self-Realization: An Ultimate Understanding".

Amrut Laya: The Stateless State
Volume 1 of Amrut Laya is composed of transcribed notes from 50 talks given by Siddharameshwar Maharaj on various themes from Dasbodh. Volume 2 of Amrut Laya consists of notes taken from 88 talks of Siddharameshwar Maharaj where he elaborates on various spiritual principles from three main classic texts, namely Dasbodh, Yogavasishtha and Eknathi Bhagawat.

Quotes of Siddharameshwar Maharaj
 "As is your concept, so will you see." - Dasbodh: Chapter 12, Subchapter 8, Verse 1
 "If you go beyond the source you will find that there exists nothing".
 "Spiritual science is the science where self is considered to first and foremost".
 "Mind is a collection of determinants and doubts".

Notes

References

Sources

Published sources

Web-sources

External links
 siddharameshwar.org website dedicated to Siddharameshwar Maharaj
 nondualite.free.fr, Shri Sadguru Siddharameshwar Maharaj
 Talks by Siddharameshwar Maharaj
 Classical Hindu texts used by Siddharameshwar Maharaj

Advaitin philosophers
1888 births
1936 deaths
Indian Hindu spiritual teachers
Inchegeri Sampradaya